Veternička Rampa is an urban neighborhood of the city of Novi Sad, Serbia.

Borders
The southern border of Veternička Rampa is Novosadski put (Novi Sad Road), the eastern border is Ulica Somborska rampa (Somborska Rampa Street), the northern border is a prolongation of the Bulevar Vojvode Stepe (Vojvoda Stepa Boulevard), and the western border is a western city limit of Novi Sad.

Neighbouring settlements
The neighbouring settlements are: Novo Naselje in the east, Adice in the south, Jugovićevo in the north, and Veternik in the west.

History
Veternička Rampa was settled during the 1990s by the Serb refugees from Bosnia and Croatia.

See also
Neighborhoods of Novi Sad

References
Program radova na uređivanju građevinskog zemljišta za 2003. godinu, Zavod za izgradnju grada, Novi Sad.

External links
"24. Oktobar" d.o.o. - Gasification in Novi Sad

Novi Sad neighborhoods